Kuhfelde is a municipality in the district Altmarkkreis Salzwedel, in Saxony-Anhalt, Germany. Since 2009 it has included the former municipalities of Püggen, Siedenlangenbeck and Valfitz.

References

Altmarkkreis Salzwedel